The Mortier de 12 pouces Gribeauval (Gribeauval 12-inch mortar) was a French mortar and part of the Gribeauval system developed by Jean Baptiste Vaquette de Gribeauval. It was part of the siege artillery. The measurement of the mortar is expressed by the diameter of the ball, using the French ancient system of measurement, in which 1 pouce (1 inch) is worth 2.707 cm.

The Mortier de 12 pouces Gribeauval was used extensively during the wars following the French Revolution, as well as the Napoleonic wars. However, its first major operational use was even earlier, during the American Revolutionary War, in General Rochambeau's French expeditionary corps, from 1780 to late 1782, and especially at Yorktown in 1781.

Gomer system

The Mortier de 12 pouces used a cylindrical chamber, which, although quite efficient, used to wear easily. It was superseded by the Gomer system using a conical chamber, which was incorporated in Gribeauval's system in 1789.

Some of the Mortier de 12 pouces were used in coastal defenses, in which case they were fixed on solid metal platforms.

Notes

References
Chartrand, René 2003 Napoleon's guns 1792-1815 (2)  Osprey Publishing

External links

Mortars of France
320 mm artillery